Sellou ( səllu), also called slilou or sfouf, is a dessert consumed in Morocco. It is made from a base of roasted flour mixed with butter, honey, almonds, sesame, and possibly other nuts and spices, it is one of the important dishes in Morocco during the holy month of Ramadan.

See also
Moroccan cuisine
List of Moroccan dishes
Gofio

References

Arab cuisine
Moroccan cuisine
Desserts
Moroccan pastry